Lawrence House may refer to:

in the United Kingdom
Lawrence House, Cornwall, England
Lawrence House,  Tremadog, Caernarfonshire, Wales, birthplace and home of T. E. Lawrence

in the United States (by state then city)
Abner Elliot England-Guy Hidden Lawrence House, Phoenix, Arizona, listed on the National Register of Historic Places (NRHP) in Maricopa County
Isaac Lawrence House, Canaan, Connecticut, listed on the NRHP in Litchfield County 
Lawrence (Seaford, Delaware), listed on the NRHP in Sussex County
Lawrence House (Baltimore, Maryland)
Lawrence Model Lodging Houses, Boston, Massachusetts, listed on the NRHP in Suffolk County 
Albree-Hall-Lawrence House, Medford, Massachusetts, listed on the NRHP in Middlesex County
William Lawrence House (Taunton, Massachusetts), listed on the NRHP in Bristol County
Phineas Lawrence House, Waltham, Massachusetts, listed on the NRHP in Middlesex County
Lawrence Opera House, Lawrence, Nebraska, listed on the NRHP in Nuckolls County 
Lawrence Farm, Troy, New Hampshire, listed on the NRHP in Cheshire County
Pearson-How, Cooper, and Lawrence Houses, Burlington, New Jersey, listed on the NRHP in Burlington County
Lawrence Mansion, Hamburg, New Jersey, listed on the NRHP in Burlington County
Hunter-Lawrence-Jessup House, Woodbury, New Jersey, listed on the NRHP in Gloucester County
Calvin Wray Lawrence House, Apex, North Carolina, listed on the NRHP in Wake County 
John P. Lawrence Plantation, Grissom, North Carolina, listed on the NRHP in Wake County
D. H. Lawrence Ranch, San Cristobal, New Mexico, listed as D. H. Lawrence Ranch Historic District on the NRHP in Taos County
Dr. Elmo N. Lawrence House, Raleigh, North Carolina, listed on the NRHP in Wake County 
Duke-Lawrence House, Rich Square, North Carolina, listed on the NRHP in Northampton County
William Lawrence House (Bellefontaine, Ohio), listed on the NRHP in Logan County
G. E. Lawrence House, Lufkin, Texas, listed on the NRHP in Angelina County
Stephen Decatur Lawrence Farmstead, Mesquite, Texas, listed on the NRHP in Dallas County
Lawrence House (Victoria, Texas), listed on the NRHP in Victoria County
Amos Lawrence House, Manchester, Vermont, listed on the NRHP in Bennington County
Frank Lawrence House, Basham, Virginia, listed on the NRHP listings in Montgomery County

See also
William Lawrence House (disambiguation)